Negeri Sembilan Football Club, commonly referred to as Negeri Sembilan FC or simply NSFC, is a Malaysian professional football club based in Seremban, Negeri Sembilan, Malaysia. The club competes in the top division of Malaysian football, the Malaysia Super League.

Founded in 1923 as Negeri Sembilan Football Association it has been chaired by Tunku Syed Razman ibni al-Marhum Tunku Syed 'Idrus al-Qadri since 2018. The club's home ground is Tuanku Abdul Rahman Stadium, located at Paroi, Negeri Sembilan. The club represented the state of Negeri Sembilan Darul Khusus, Malaysia, and won their first major honour in the 1948 Malaysia Cup. In the southern part of the country, there is a three-way rivalry between Negeri Sembilan, Melaka, and Johor Darul Ta'zim; they fight to be the best club representing the Southern Region of Malaysia. The derby between the club and Melaka is known as the Naning Derby (Malay:) while the one with Johor Darul Ta'zim is known as the Southern Derby (Malay:).

Since its establishment in 1923, Negeri Sembilan has won several domestic cups, such as the Malaysia Cup in 1948, 2009, and 2011, as well as the FA Cup in 2003 and 2010. In addition, the club won the Malaysian Super League in 2006 and managed to qualify for the AFC Cup, a continental-level competition, in 2004 and 2007. The club also gave rise to many Malaysian football stars who brought success to both club and country, such as Kwan Soon Teck, Mok Wai Hong, B. Rajinikandh, N. Thanabalan, B. Sathianathan, Ching Hong Aik, Shukor Adan, Norhafiz Zamani Misbah, Aidil Zafuan, Zaquan Adha, Farizal Marlias, S. Kunanlan, Shahurain Abu Samah, and many more.

On October 20, 2020, the club officially made its privatisation under a new entity as Negeri Sembilan Football Club after it was officially approved by the Football Association of Malaysia (FAM).  The club has been registered under a private limited company named Negeri Sembilan Football Club Sdn. Bhd.. The club became a subsidiary of the Negeri Sembilan Football Association (PBNS), which is also the owner of the club.

Names

 1923–2005: Negeri Sembilan
 2005–2008: Negeri Sembilan Naza
 2009–2014: Negeri Sembilan
 2015: Negeri Sembilan Matrix 
 2016–2020: Negeri Sembilan
 2020–present: Negeri Sembilan F.C.

Club licensing regulations
The club had obtained the FAM Club License 2022 edition to play in the 2023 Malaysia Super League season and had obtained the AFC Club License and is eligible to play in the competition organised by the AFC; the 2023 AFC Champions League and 2023 AFC Cup if qualified on merit.

Crest and colours

Crest 
Negeri Sembilan previously used the crest of the Negeri Sembilan Football Association (PBNS). After being privatised in 2020, the Negeri Sembilan FC team started using the new crest after PBNS organised a competition to create a logo for Negeri Sembilan FC. The competition was won by the logo designed by Azral Ramlay, which has been used by the team since 2020.

Rice Stalks: The main crest displays nine white rice stalks tied with red rope into one in the middle, symbolising the nine states in the old Negeri Sembilan:  Jelai, Jelebu, Johol, Kelang (now part of Selangor), Naning (now part of Malacca), Rembau, Segamat-Pasir Besar, Sungei Ujong, and Ulu Pahang. This logo also maintains the use of rice stalks as in the logo of the Negeri Sembilan Football Association (PBNS), which was established in 1923, but improvises by tying all the rice stalks into a symbol of unity.

Circle: The basic shape, which is a golden yellow circle in the royal color, symbolises the strong unity between the team, players, supporters, and the people of Negeri Sembilan who are together within the Negeri Sembilan Traditional Land under the auspices of D.Y.M.M. Yang Di-Pertuan Besar Negeri Sembilan Darul Khusus.

Escutcheon: The escutcheon of the arms is depicted as an Old French shield outlined in black. The three basic colours of Negeri Sembilan on the shield symbolise all the people, players, and supporters coming together to protect and defend their beloved team from being damaged by the enemy, along with the lyrics of the Negeri Sembilan song, "Musuhnya Habis Binasa" (English: "").

Colours 
Yellow, black and red: Negeri Sembilan uses three colours from the state flag of Negeri Sembilan as its official colours. The colours have been used on the crest and team kits since its establishment. Based on the flag, the yellow represents the Yang di-Pertuan Besar of Negeri Sembilan, the black symbolises the four undangs (traditional chiefs), and the red denotes the citizens of the state. However, in the context of the football team, these three colours have their own meaning: yellow represents the team, black symbolises the players, and red denotes the supporters. 

Kits: Mostly, the team uses yellow as the dominant colour for the home kit with the addition of some red and black colors, while for the away kit, the dominant colour is red with the addition of some yellow and black colors. Sometimes the team reverses red as the home kit colour and yellow as the away kit colour; this depends on the agreement between the team and the kit manufacturer as well as the conditions of the competing league's management. As for the team's third kit, there are several dominant colour variations, such as white, blue, and black.

History

Early era 

The club was established in 1923, according to a passage in the football history books of Malaysia based on an interview with Austin Senevirathe, who was 93 years old when interviewed. He stated that the Malaya Cup match between Negeri Sembilan and Singapore took place in that particular year.

In 1927, PBNS started organising league matches. Among the trophies that were up for grabs at that time were the Annex Shield, the British Resident's Cup, and the Hose Cup. The earliest football clubs that existed and competed in the league were Negri Sembilan Chinese "A," Negri Sembilan Club, Port Dickson Recreation Club, Sungei Ujong Club, Negri Sembilan Chinese "B," and St. Paul's Old Boys Association.

The club is considered one of the top competing teams in the history of football since its establishment. They have won many top competitions in Malaysia, starting in the early 1940s.

In 1948, they won the first HMS Malaya Cup, led by skipper Kwan Soon Teck .

Isa Samad era (1982-2004) 

In 1982, Tan Sri Dato' Seri Utama Mohd Isa bin Dato' Haji Abdul Samad was appointed president of the Negeri Sembilan Football Association (PBNS) as well as the Menteri Besar of Negeri Sembilan.

The year 1991 was the year of the revival of the Negeri Sembilan team, which in previous years had been an underdog. That was also the last year the Negeri Sembilan team used the Majlis Perbandaran Seremban Stadium before the Tuanku Abdul Rahman Stadium in Paroi was used as their home ground until now. On August 18, 1991, the team met Sarawak in the final match of the Division 2 League at the Majlis Perbandaran Seremban Stadium. Negeri Sembilan, who was in first place at the time, only needed a draw while Sarawak, who was in second place, needed a win to get the top spot in the league table. The match of that day went to Negeri Sembilan with a result of 2-2, and they managed to collect one point. It was the last year that led to the success of winning the Semi-Pro League Division 2, then qualifying for Division 1 in 1992. Among the star players at that time were the import trio, the Bozik Brothers (Miroslav and Robert), and the powerful striker Marian Vazquez. Local players include Richard Scully, Mansor Sulaiman, and Nazari Hussein.

In 1992, the construction of Tuanku Abdul Rahman Stadium was completed and inaugurated to be used as a multipurpose stadium. The stadium initially held a capacity of 20,000 people, and since then, the Negeri Sembilan team has officially made the stadium their home ground for the Liga Semi-Pro Divisyen 1 tournament in that year.

In the 1996 season, Negeri Sembilan became one of the contenders for the league title. Even though it was not given much attention at first, the team starring two former import players from Argentina, Pahang FA's Gus Cerro and Jose Iriarte, surprised many when they gave great competition to other selected teams such as Selangor, Sabah, Sarawak, Kedah, Pahang, and Brunei. Othman Katmon, Faizal Zainal, Khairil Zainal, Rosli Omar, B. Rajinikandh (now converted to Islam), A. Ganeson, V. Arumugham, Idris Kadir, Azmi Mohamed, and Ching Hong Aik (only a few mentions) have put up a good fight, giving great hope to their loyal supporters. However, this squad failed to maintain the momentum when it was finally overtaken by Sabah FA, who emerged as the Premier League champion, as well as Kedah FA, who became the runner-up.

On May 31, 2003, Negeri Sembilan met Perlis in the FA Cup final. Played at Perak Stadium, the club was surprised by the opponent's early goal in the 11th minute. The club managed to close the gap in the 56th minute thanks to a goal by Effendi Malek. The game remained 1-1 until the 90th minute, and in extra time, victory was decided on a golden goal. In the 95th minute, the club managed to get the golden goal as a result of Everson Martinelli's goal, and the club was crowned FA Cup champion in 2003.

Negeri Sembilan made its first appearance in the AFC Cup competition in the 2004 season. The club made its debut in the first match against Island FC with a big 6-0 win on February 10, 2004. However, the club had to settle for being 3rd in the group after losing all the group stage matches against Geylang United, East Bengal, and Island FC. All teams played at home and away for a total of six games.

Mohamad Hasan era (2004-2018) 

In March 2004, Datuk Seri Mohamad Hasan was appointed as the president of the Negeri Sembilan Football Association (PBNS). It's because he successfully held the position as the 10th Menteri Besar of Negeri Sembilan and replaced Isa Samad, who held that position the previous year. Mohamad Hasan was the first Menteri Besar who had ever been a local football player and then became the president of PBNS. He never represented the first team of Negeri Sembilan but played a lot with clubs in Kuala Lumpur and Selangor. He was banned from football for life after receiving a red card when NS Malays played against NS Indians in 1977. He was active in football in the 1970s.

In the 2006 season, the team won the Malaysia Super League by finishing first out of eight clubs that competed. The newly promoted team from the Malaysian Premier League in the 2005 season managed to become the league champion in their first appearance since the Super League was introduced in 2004.

On November 7, 2009, the team ended their 61-year drought in the Malaysia Cup after posting a convincing 3–1 victory over Kelantan in the final at the National Stadium, Bukit Jalil. The team also won all the matches in the Malaysia Cup tournament, starting from the group stage until the final. That final match was a fantastic night.

The repeat final of 2009 between the club and Kelantan happened again on October 30, 2010. However, this time, the club lost 1–2 to Kelantan despite having taken an early lead through a penalty by Shahurain Abu Samah.

On April 10, 2010, Negeri Sembilan needed the luck of the penalty shootout to win the FA Cup championship again by beating Kedah 5-4 in the final of the 21st edition at the National Stadium, Bukit Jalil. This continues to confirm them as the new powerhouse of national football after winning the Malaysia Cup last season. Both teams were tied at 1-1 after the end of the 90 minutes of the actual game, even after the referee, R. Krishnan, dragged it into extra time in front of about 70,000 spectators, the majority of whom were "Hijau Kuning" supporters.

In 2011, the club again qualified for the Malaysia Cup Final for the third time in a row, this time with their new coach, Mohd Azraai Khor Abdullah. They won the trophy after defeating Terengganu FA with an epic comeback. The first goal was scored by Mohd Ashaari Shamsuddin for Terengganu in the 59th minute. PBNS used the last 10 minutes of the game to make a comeback. S. Kunanlan equalised the score in the 81st minute before Hairuddin Omar, the veteran striker, hit the winning goal for PBNS with a beautiful volley in the 85th minute.

In the early part of the 2011 season, one of the team's all-time best coaches, Wan Jamak Wan Hassan, resigned from the club. He sees no excuses for the team's disappointing run in the Malaysia Super League and Malaysia FA Cup competitions for that season.

Throughout the years 2003–2011, there was a "golden generation" for the Negeri Sembilan team because, throughout the year, the team achieved a lot of success in competitions at the domestic level. Starting with winning the FA Cup in 2003, the team managed to win the Super League in 2006. The most proud performance was when Negeri Sembilan successfully made it through the Malaysia Cup final stage three years in a row from 2009–2011. The team won two finals in 2009 and 2011, and in 2010, the team became runners-up when they had to accept a defeat, but they managed to win the FA Cup in the same year (2010). In addition, this golden era also saw the emergence of several big names who were with the Negeri Sembilan team in the Malaysian football scene, including Ching Hong Aik, Shukor Adan, Norhafiz Zamani, Khairul Anuar Baharom, Bekamenga Bekamengo, Sani Anuar, Rezal Zambery, Zaquan Adha, Aidil Zafuan, Farizal Marlias, S. Kunanlan and Shahurain.

On December 6, 2014, the president of the Negeri Sembilan Football Association announced that the Negeri Sembilan team would be known as the Negeri Sembilan Matrix from the 2015 season. This has become the beginning of the process of privatising the Negeri Sembilan.

On June 7, 2018, the Negeri Sembilan Football Association (PBNS) lost an experienced figure when Datuk Seri Mohamad Hasan resigned as president of the association. Also followed Mohamad's footsteps were two vice presidents, Datuk Mohamad Haslah Mohd Amin, who was also the PBNS Chief Finance Officer and manager of the Negeri Sembilan Super League team, and lastly, Datuk Abd Ghani Hasan .

Razman al-Qadri era (2018-present) 

On September 10, 2018, Tunku Besar of Tampin, Tunku Syed Razman Tunku Syed Idrus Al-Qadri, was elected as the new President of the Negeri Sembilan Football Association (PBNS) for the period of 2018–2021 after winning unopposed at the 86th PBNS Congress, held at Klana Resort.

Until 2020, the team competes within the capacity of the Football Association (FA). However, the team has finally succeeded in being privatised in the football club privatisation campaign by the Football Association of Malaysia (FAM) in September 2020 and has been performing as a "football club" (FC) since the 2021 season.

Stadium

Negeri Sembilan has used several football fields and stadiums as their home ground. Home ground is their own playing field, as opposed to that of other teams. 

 1940s–1982: Seremban Municipal Council Field

Around the 1940s, Negeri Sembilan started playing at Seremban Municipal Council Field since it was built by the British Resident of Negeri Sembilan, John Vincent Cowgill, in the early 1940. Seremban Municipal Council Field, or better known as Padang Stesyen (English: Station Field) because it was located next to the Seremban railway station, has a sweet history for Negeri Sembilan since it was the first venue where the HMS Malaya Cup was lifted by the team. In the beginning, this field did not have seating facilities, and spectators only sat on the sides of the field. In 1960, after Independence Day, this field was upgraded by building 500 seats that can accommodate about 5,000 people.

In 1973, Padang Stesyen was upgraded to allow the field to be used for the Field Hockey World Cup in 1975, when Malaysia was chosen as the host country and Padang Stesyen became one of the competition venues. At this time the seats were increased to 5,000 uncovered seats, which made Padang Stesyen famous at the time due to the good pitch conditions for a world-class tournament.

 1982: Kuala Pilah Stadium

Kuala Pilah Mini Stadium, or Kuala Pilah Stadium, was used as the temporary home ground of the Negeri Sembilan team in 1982. The stadium located in Kuala Pilah was used because Padang Stesyen was being upgraded at that time.

 1982–1992: Seremban Municipal Council Stadium

In 1982, Padang Stesyen was upgraded by the Negeri Sembilan government due to Seremban being upgraded as a city. This also caused the name of the field to be changed to Seremban Municipal Council Stadium. The Negeri Sembilan team reused this field as their home ground until 1992, when that was the last year the team used the stadium, and it became the starting point for the revival of the Negeri Sembilan team. This iconic stadium was later demolished to make way for the development of Seremban and construction of a shopping centre in 1993.

 1992: Tuanku Abdul Rahman Stadium

The Tuanku Abdul Rahman Stadium (STAR) (Malay: Stadium Tuanku Abdul Rahman), also known by its informal name Stadium Paroi and nickname "The STAR of Paroi," is a multi-purpose stadium in Paroi, Negeri Sembilan, Malaysia. Inaugurated in 1992, the stadium initially held a capacity of 20,000 people. Negeri Sembilan has been using the STAR as their home ground since 1992, and this stadium has been the place where various glorious histories of the Negeri Sembilan team were created. The stadium is named in honour of Tuanku Abdul Rahman ibni Almarhum Tuanku Muhammad, the eighth Yamtuan Besar of Seri Menanti, the second Yamtuan Besar of modern-day Negeri Sembilan, and the first Yang di-Pertuan Agong of Malaysia. In 2004, the capacity of the stadium had been upgraded to 45,000 people for the hosting of the 2004 Sukma Games.

Players

Current squad 

 

 

  

Remarks:
I International player. A Asian player. S ASEAN player. U23 Under-23 player. U20 Under-20 player. U18 Under-18 player.

Out on loan

Development Squads

U-23 Squad 
Currently plays in the MFL Cup tournament.

Remarks:
I International player. A Asian player. S ASEAN player. U23 Under-23 player. U20 Under-20 player. U18 Under-18 player.

U-20 Squad 
Currently plays in the President Cup tournament.

Honours

Domestic competitions

League 

 Division 1 / Premier 1 / Super League
 Winners (1):  2006
 Runner-up (1): 2008
 Division 2 / Premier 2 / Premier League
 Winners (2): 1991, 2021
 Runner-up (1): 2005
 Division 3 / FAM League / Piala FAM
 Runner-up (1): 1956

U21 team 

 President's Cup
 Winners (2): 2001, 2002
 Runner-up (1): 1993

Cups 

 Malaysia Cup
 Winners (3): 1948, 2009, 2011
 Runner-up (3): 2000, 2006, 2010
 FA Cup
 Winners (2): 2003, 2010
 Charity Cup
 Winners (1): 2012
 Runner-up (2): 2004, 2010
 Federal Territory Minister Cup
 Winners (1): 2022

Asian

 AFC Cup
 Group Stage: 2004, 2007
 Withdrew: 2010

Season by season records

Updated on 13 May 2019.

Note:

Pld = Played, W = Won, D = Drawn, L = Lost, F = Goals for, A = Goals against, Pts= Points, Pos = Position

Source:

Individual player awards

M-League Golden boot winners

M-League Top goalscorers

Kit manufacturers and financial sponsor

Management team 
Owner: Negeri Sembilan Football Association (PBNS)

Negeri Sembilan Football Association 

Source:

Negeri Sembilan Football Club 

Source:

NSFC U-23 

Source:

NSFC U-20 

Source:

Coaches

List of Negeri Sembilan FC (NSFC) coaches/managers.

Notable players 
This list displays a line of current and former players who contributed a lot to the team and are considered prominent players. List of players who became the main pillar of success in the team, players who started to shine while with the team, players who were national players while with the team, players who got appearances for the national team while with the team, players who were loved by the fans and the team, players who contributed a lot of appearances, assists, and goals, players who have served for a long time to become legendary figures for the team, and players who are the primary reason for the team's revival.

References

External links
 

 
Malaysia Premier League clubs
Malaysia Super League clubs
Football clubs in Malaysia
Malaysia Cup winners
1923 establishments in British Malaya
Football associations in Malaysia